The figure skating pairs competition at the 1956 Winter Olympics took place on 3–4 February. Austrian pair of Sissy Schwarz / Kurt Oppelt won the competition. Pairs from Canada and Hungary took second and third respectively. The pairs competition was the last figure skating event of the Olympics. It was held out doors at the Olympic Ice Stadium in Cortina d'Ampezzo, Italy, the host city for the Games.

Results
Source:

See also

 1956 Winter Olympics

References

External links
 

Figure skating at the 1956 Winter Olympics
1956
Mixed events at the 1956 Winter Olympics